Charles Hope Kerr (April 23, 1860 – June 1, 1944), was an American publisher and editor. A son of abolitionists, he was a vegetarian and Unitarian in 1886 when he established Charles H. Kerr & Co. in Chicago. His publishing career is noted for his views' leftward progression toward socialism and support for the Industrial Workers of the World.

Biography

Early life
Charles' father, Alexander Kerr was born in Fetterangus, Aberdeenshire, Scotland. He was the son of George and Helen Legge Kerr. When he was about seven the family emigrated first to Canada, and then three years later in 1838 to Illinois, in the United States of America.

Career
Kerr started his career at a Unitarian publisher and joined the staff of the Unity magazine in the mid-1880s. To support the magazine, he eventually established his own publishing house Charles H. Kerr & Co. in 1893. Influenced by the US People's Party, Kerr began to publish more political works on topics like land reform, including a new monthly magazine New Occasions. 

In January 1900, Algie Martin Simons was hired by Kerr to launch a new, more explicitly socialist magazine, what would become the International Socialist Review. Over the years, Kerr's company became a leading publisher of socialist, communist, anarchist, and Wobbly works. In 1908, Kerr fired Simons and assumed responsibility for the International Socialist Review when it was a major left-wing voice within the Socialist Party of America.

Kerr was noted for his translation from the French of the radical workers' anthem, "The Internationale;" his version became the English words sung in the United States (although a different, anonymous English translation is sung in Britain and Ireland). Kerr's version was widely circulated in the Little Red Songbook of the Industrial Workers of the World.

Kerr was active in partisan politics as well. He was on the National Campaign Committee of the Social Democratic Party of America and later the Socialist Party of America. He was on the executive committee of the Socialist Party of Chicago, including a brief stint as treasurer. He was secretary of the Socialist Party of Illinois in 1902.

Vegetarianism

Kerr was a vegetarian and his company published J. Howard Moore's The Universal Kinship.

Works
Articles:
 "What Socialism Is," International Socialist Review, (1917)

Compilations:
 Unity songs resung (1884)

Translations:
 The right to be lazy, and other studies (1907)

References

Bibliography
 The International Socialist Review (ISR), 1900
The Militant Proletariat
Tim Dayton, "Red Ink: The Charles H. Kerr Story"
 H.L. Green, "Charles H. Kerr," The Free Thought Magazine [Chicago], vol. 14, no. 1 (Jan. 1896), pp. 1, 48-50.

External links 

 
 Tim Davenport (ed.), "Publications by Charles H. Kerr & Co. (1885-1940s): Listed Alphabetically by Author," Corvallis, OR: Early American Marxism website, 2014.
 Charles H. Kerr Company Records at the Newberry Library
  (previous page of browse report as 'Kerr, Charles H., 1860–' without '1944')
 Charles H. Kerr Company at LC Authorities, 5 records, and at WorldCat
May Walden Papers at the Newberry

1860 births
1944 deaths
American publishers (people)
American socialists
American vegetarianism activists
People from Chicago
Social Democratic Party of America politicians
Socialist Party of America politicians from Illinois